Robert Russell Hall (September 29, 1871 – July 1, 1937) was a Major League Baseball shortstop who played for two seasons. He played for the St. Louis Browns in 1897 and the Cleveland Blues in 1901.

External links

1871 births
1937 deaths
Major League Baseball shortstops
St. Louis Browns (NL) players
Cleveland Blues (1901) players
19th-century baseball players
Minor league baseball managers
Columbus Babies players
Dallas Steers players
Wichita Eagles players
Columbus Buckeyes (minor league) players
Columbus Senators players
Grand Rapids Furnituremakers players
Buffalo Bisons (minor league) players
St. Joseph Saints players
Helena Senators players
Los Angeles (minor league baseball) players
Kansas City Cowboys (minor league) players
Seattle Siwashes players
Baseball players from Kentucky